The term Panama Mount describes a gun mount developed by the U.S. Army in Panama during the 1920s for fixed coastal artillery positions. Panama mounts were widely used during the buildup to and during World War II by the United States military.

The concrete column was connected to the outer concrete ring by concrete beams for alignment/stability. Originally traverse was accomplished with several men and prybars to move the trailing arms around the steel ring. Later installations included a geared steel ring just inside of the outer steel rail for improved traverse. The Canon de 155mm GPF, designated 155 mm gun M1917 (French-made) or M1918 (US-made) in U.S. service, was often married with Panama mounts; these were the primary weapons of the United States Army Coast Artillery Corps' tractor-drawn mobile units 1920-1945.

In World War II, Panama mounts were used to rearm six Harbor Defense Commands that had been disarmed in the 1920s, and were used to augment existing and new harbor defenses in the US and overseas. They were used for new defenses in Alaska, Newfoundland, Puerto Rico, and Australia.

The term Panama mount is often incorrectly used to describe other gun mounts with similar layouts and/or purpose.

Many surviving examples of these mounts can be found throughout former US coast defense sites including California, Florida, Alaska, and Panama.

See also
 Barbette mount
 Disappearing carriage
 Seacoast defense in the United States
 List of U.S. Army weapons by supply catalog designation

References

 
 List of all US coastal forts and batteries at the Coast Defense Study Group, Inc. website

External links
Sitka's 155mm Battery
USACE Cape Cod Canal
Americans in Aruba

Coastal artillery
United States Army Coast Artillery Corps